San Antonio station is an Amtrak railroad station located on the eastern portion of Downtown San Antonio, in San Antonio, Texas.

San Antonio station hosts two Amtrak services; the tri-weekly Sunset Limited and the daily Texas Eagle. Four days a week, San Antonio is the southern terminus of the Texas Eagle, which originates in Chicago. Three days a week, the Texas Eagle joins with the Sunset Limited, continuing westbound to Los Angeles. It is the second busiest Amtrak station in Texas, behind Fort Worth Central Station.

History
Amtrak previously used the historic Southern Pacific Railroad (SP) Station,  also known as Sunset Station. It was designed by SP's architect Daniel J. Patterson in the Spanish Mission Revival style, and built in 1902 by the SP.  The train station was listed on the National Register of Historic Places in 1975.

Amtrak moved operations in 1998 to a smaller depot that was built adjacent to the older Sunset Station.  Under its owner, VIA Metropolitan Transit, the historic Sunset Station underwent an extensive restoration and now serves as an entertainment complex.  The station also neighbors the Alamodome and the Robert Thompson Transit Station. 

A preserved 2-8-2 Baldwin "Mikado" steam locomotive, Southern Pacific No. 794 was donated to the City of San Antonio at the end of its service life in 1956, and placed on static display at nearby Maverick Park for decades before being relocated to the station in January 1999. Since September 2008, it has been under the care of volunteers from the San Antonio Railroad Heritage Museum.

References

External links

Texaseagle.com: San Antonio Amtrak station for "Texas Eagle" line information
Profile of San Antonio Station
Official Sunset Station complex webpage
Austin Steam Train Association
Train Web, USA Rail Guide: San Antonio Amtrak Station & Sunset Depot

San Antonio (Amtrak station)
Buildings and structures in San Antonio
San Antonio Station
Transportation in San Antonio
Railway stations in the United States opened in 1902
National Register of Historic Places in San Antonio
Railway stations on the National Register of Historic Places in Texas
Mission Revival architecture in Texas
Spanish Colonial Revival architecture in Texas